The 2021 K3 League was the second season of the K3 League as a semi-professional league and the third tier of South Korean football league system.

Gimhae FC are the defending champions.

Competition format 
15 teams will compete in the 2021 season. Each team will play 28 games this season. The 15th team will be relegated to K4 League, and the relegation/promotion playoff will be held between 14th team of K3 league and 3rd team of K4 league.

Promotion and relegation
Teams relegated to the 2021 K4 League
 Chuncheon Citizen
 Jeonju Citizen

Teams promoted from the 2020 K4 League
 Paju Citizen
 Ulsan Citizen

Name Changes
 Gimpo Citizen FC renamed to Gimpo FC
 Mokpo City FC renamed to FC Mokpo

Teams Dissolved from 2020 Season
 Gyeongju Citizen

Teams

Foreign players

League table

Results

Matches 1-28 (Rounds 1-30)

Championship play-off
Championship Play-off start at 17 November to Final at 27 November 2021. If scores are tied after regular time, the higher placed team advances to the next phase.

1R

Mokpo City advances as a higher ranked team in the regular season.

2R

Final
1st;

2nd;
 Gimpo FC won 2021 K3 League and champion by agg. 3-2.

Promotion–relegation play-off
The K3-K4 League Promotion–relegation play-offs were cancelled as Gimpo FC announced that Gimpo FC will be changed to a professional football club and will participate in 2022 K League 2 as a professional football club. So Yangju Citizen (14th team) has remained at 2022 K3 League and Dangjin Citizen (winner of promotion play-off in K4 League) was promoted to 2022 K3 League.

Winner

See also
 2021 Korean FA Cup
 2021 K League 1
 2021 K League 2
 2021 K4 League
 2021 K5 League
 2021 K6 League
 2021 K7 League

References

K3 League seasons
2021 in South Korean football